Tetracis mosesiani is a moth of the family Geometridae. It is found coastal California from near sea level to 915 meters.

The length of the forewings 17–23 mm. Adults are on wing from October to early December.

Larvae feed on Lonicera hispidula.

External links
Revision of the North American genera Tetracis Guenée and synonymization of Synaxis Hulst with descriptions of three new species (Lepidoptera: Geometridae: Ennominae)

Tetracis
Moths described in 1971